Moonshine is illicitly distilled high-proof liquor.

Moonshine may also refer to:

Moonlight, the light that reaches Earth from the Moon

Film and television
Moonshine (film), a 1918 American silent comedy starring Fatty Arbuckle and Buster Keaton
Moonshine (Canadian TV series), a 2021 Canadian drama series
Moonshine (South Korean TV series), a 2021 television series

Music
Moonshine Music, an American record label 1992–2007

Albums
Moonshine (Bert Jansch album) or the title song, 1973
Moonshine (Brian Cadd album) or the title song, 1974
Moonshine (Dave Douglas album) or the title song, 2007
Moonshine (Kate Maki album), 2011
Moonshine (Savage album) or the title song (see below), 2005
Moonshine (Tyler Carter album) or the title song, 2019

Songs
"Moonshine" (Bruno Mars song), 2012
"Moonshine" (Savage song), 2005
"Moonshine", by Badfinger from Head First, 2000
"Moonshine", by Dennis Wilson from Pacific Ocean Blue, 1977
"Moonshine", by Fran Healy from Wreckorder, 2010
"Moonshine", by Free from Tons of Sobs, 1969
"Moonshine", by Mike Oldfield from Tubular Bells II, 1992
"Moonshine", by Mike Oldfield from Man on the Rocks, 2014
"Moonshine", by Caravan Palace from Chronologic, 2019
"Moonshine", by Puddle of Mudd from  Famous, 2007

Places
Moonshine, Illinois, US
Moonshine, Louisiana, US
Moonshine Township, Big Stone County, Minnesota, US
Moonshine, New Zealand

Other uses
Moonshine (electronics), a World War II British electronic counter-measure
Moonshine theory, a mathematical theory
Umbral moonshine, in mathematics
Fedora 7, codenamed Moonshine, the May 2007 version of the Fedora Linux distribution
Moonshine, a 2007 Cal Leandros series novel by Rob Thurman

See also
Moonshiner (disambiguation)
Moonbeam (disambiguation)
Moonlight (disambiguation)
Moonray (disambiguation)